The 1969 Sandlapper 200 was a NASCAR Grand National Series event that was held on September 18, 1969, at Columbia Speedway in Columbia, South Carolina.

The transition to purpose-built racecars began in the early 1960s and occurred gradually over that decade.  Changes made to the sport by the late 1960s brought an end to the "strictly stock" vehicles of the 1950s.

Background
Columbia Speedway was an oval racetrack located in Cayce, a suburb of Columbia, South Carolina. It was the site of auto races for NASCAR's top series from 1951 through 1971.  For most of its history, the racing surface was dirt.  The races in April and August 1970 were two of the final three Grand National Series races ever held on a dirt track.

The track was paved before hosting its last two Grand National races in 1971.

Race report
Bobby Isaac defeated Richard Petty by half a lap in front of a live audience of 6,500 NASCAR followers. Notable crew chiefs that participated in the event were John Hill, Dick Hutcherson, Dale Inman and Harry Hyde.

The first-place position of the race changed hands three times and the race lasted one hour and twenty-five minutes. Only two caution flags were waved for 15 laps. The race was done on a dirt oval track and Isaac received $1,000 in prize winnings ($ when adjusted for inflation). There were 23 American-born drivers on the starting grid.

Eldon Yarbrough, the brother of the late LeeRoy Yarbrough, would retire from NASCAR after this race with his only top ten finish in NASCAR history. Wayne Gillette would withdraw from the race for reasons unknown and would finish the race in last place. Johnny Halford would make his NASCAR debut here.

Qualifying

Top 10 finishers

Timeline
Section reference: 
 Start of race: Richard Petty started the race with the pole position but was quickly overtaken by Bobby Isaac.
 Lap 3: Wayne Gillette quits the race due to personal reasons.
 Lap 4: Richard Petty retook the lead from Bobby Isaac.
 Lap 13: Ed Negre's transmission developed problems, forcing him out of the race.
 Lap 34: Paul Dean Holt's engine stopped working properly, ending his race weekend prematurely.
 Lap 45: The axle on Neil Castles' vehicle became problematic, ending his day on the track.
 Lap 82: David Pearson had a terminal crash, forcing him to withdraw from the event.
 Lap 108: Frank Warren's vehicle developed suspension problems, causing him to exit the race.
 Lap 135: Bobby Isaac took over the lead from Richard Petty.
 Finish: Bobby Isaac was officially declared the winner of the event.

References

Sandlapper 200
Sandlapper 200
NASCAR races at Columbia Speedway